Blåtinden is the name of many mountains in Norway:

 Blåtinden, Dyrøya, Øksnes (562 m)
 Blåtinden, Hareidlandet (697 m) 
 Blåtinden, Målselv (1378 m)
 Blåtinden, Sunnmøre (1664 m)
 Blåtinden, Uløya (1142 m)
 Blåtinden, Vestnes (1166 m)